Evelyn Mora (born Kimia Moradzadeh; April 9, 1992) is a Finnish entrepreneur and the founder of Helsinki Fashion Week, managed by the Nordic Fashion Week Association. In 2021, Nordic Fashion Week filed for bankruptcy, and Mora founded Digital Village, an internet company in Paris. Mora was also the founder of Studio Eneas, which faced criticism from others in the fashion industry for charging aspiring models and their parents for "paid folders" and thousands of euros for overseas trips. In response, Studio Eneas ceased operations and rebranded as the Evelyn Mora Corporation.

Biography 
French-Finnish Mora is also of Iranian descent through her mother. Born in Vaasa and raised in Helsinki, Finland, Mora worked as a fashion photographer in Paris and London before returning to Finland. In 2019 the event banned the use of leather in garments shown during the week. Vogue Italy described the event as "the very first 100% fully sustainable fashion week," which Mora later corrected in various outlets noting "there is no such thing as 100% sustainable yet" and that sustainability is more of "a mindset." 

Mora is a board member of the Nordic Fashion Association.

References 

1992 births
Living people
Businesspeople from Helsinki
21st-century Finnish businesspeople
Businesspeople in fashion
Finnish women in business
Finnish expatriates in England
Finnish expatriates in France
Finnish people of French descent
Finnish people of Iranian descent
People from Vaasa